The Suquamish are a Lushootseed-speaking Native American people, located in present-day Washington in the United States. They are a southern Coast Salish people. Today, most Suquamish people are enrolled in the federally recognized Suquamish Tribe, a signatory to the 1855 Treaty of Point Elliott. Chief Seattle, the famous leader of the Suquamish and Duwamish Tribes for which the City of Seattle is named, signed the Point Elliot Treaty on behalf of both Tribes. The Suquamish Tribe owns the Port Madison Indian Reservation.

Language and culture 
Suquamish people traditionally speak a dialect of Lushootseed, which belongs to the Salishan language family.

Like many Northwest Coast indigenous peoples pre-European contact, the Suquamish enjoyed the rich bounty of land and sea west of the Cascade Mountains. They fished for salmon and harvested shellfish in local waters and Puget Sound. The cedar tree provided fiber used to weave waterproof clothing and beautiful utilitarian items, and provided wood for longhouses, seagoing canoes and ceremonial items.

The Suquamish traditionally lived on the western shores of Puget Sound, from Apple Tree Cove in the north to Gig Harbor in the south, including Bainbridge Island and Blake Island. They had villages throughout the region, the largest centered on Old Man House, the largest winter longhouse in the Salish Sea and the largest longhouse ever known.

The Suquamish continue to fish and harvest in their traditional territory, and a new generation of local artists — among them Ed Carriere — carry on the ways of their ancestors in creating carved or woven items that help tell the story of the Suquamish people.

In 2011, the Suquamish Tribal Council voted unanimously to approve same-sex marriage.

History
The first contact between Suquamish and European people came in 1792 when George Vancouver explored Puget Sound and met members of the Suquamish Tribe, possibly including Schweabe and Kitsap. More regular contact with non-Natives came with the establishment of British trading posts in Puget Sound and the Strait of Georgia in the early 19th century.

Once the Washington Territory was established in 1853, the U.S. government began signing treaties with area indigenous leaders to extinguish aboriginal claims and make land available for non-Native settlement. In the Point Elliott Treaty signed on January 22, 1855, the Suquamish agreed to cede land to the United States in exchange for certain payments and obligations. They reserved for themselves the land that became designated as the Port Madison Indian Reservation, near their winter village on Agate Pass. They also reserved the right to fish and harvest shellfish in their Usual and Accustomed Areas, and reserved certain cultural and natural resource rights within their historical territory. Today, the Suquamish Tribe is a co-manager with the State of Washington of the state's salmon fishery.

Leaders and notable people
Two members of the Suquamish came to be recognized across the region as great leaders. One was Kitsap, who led a coalition of Puget Sound Tribes against the Cowichan Tribes of Vancouver Island around 1825. Another was Seattle (also spelled Si-ahl, Sealth, See-ahth, and Seathl, pronounced ), son of Schweabe, who was a peacekeeper during the turbulent times of the mid-19th century.

Martha George served as chairwoman of the Suquamish Tribe from the late 1920s to the early 1940s.

Lawrence Webster (1899-1991) served as chairman of the Suquamish Tribe from 1979-1985. In 1979, he traveled to Washington, D.C., to represent Native Americans at an event commemorating the 15th anniversary of the government program, VISTA. In 1983, he helped establish the Suquamish Museum. Earlier in his life, he was a noted baseball catcher, playing on a Suquamish team in 1921 that was sent by a national sporting-goods company on a goodwill tour of Japan.

Leonard Forsman, an anthropologist and archeologist who has served as the Suquamish Tribe’s chairman since 2005, is a governor-appointed member of the state Board on Geographic Names and an Obama appointee to the U.S. Advisory Council on Historic Preservation.

Cindy Webster-Martinson, a former Suquamish Tribal Council member, is vice president of the North Kitsap School Board (elected in 2013 to a four-year term) and is believed to be the first Native American elected to non-Tribal public office in Kitsap County. She is a granddaughter of Lawrence Webster.

Governance
The Suquamish Tribe is governed by a seven-member council, elected by citizens of the Suquamish Tribe. Government departments include administration, child support enforcement, community development, court, early learning center, education, fisheries, human services, legal, natural resources, police. (The Tribe contracts with local fire districts for fire protection service.)

Economy
Port Madison Enterprises, the Tribe’s economic development arm, is the second-largest private-sector employer in Kitsap County with 752 employees, surpassed only by Harrison Medical Center.

Port Madison Enterprises is governed by a seven-member board of directors, which includes a Tribal Council liaison. Notable ventures include the Suquamish Clearwater Casino Resort, White Horse Golf Club, Kiana Lodge, PME Retail, and Property Management. Ongoing subsidiaries include the Port Madison Enterprises Construction Corporation. 

Economic contributions (in 2012): $52.2 million in wages and benefits paid to employees; $46.8 million in goods and services purchased; $18.6 million in capital project investment. Community contributions (in 2012): $694,033 awarded to 201 organizations.

The PME Fund sets aside non-gaming funds for distribution as grants to organizations that “[improve] the lives of community members” and “support worthy programs in the region.”

Reservation

The Tribe has reacquired land lost during the allotment era, and “the Tribe and Tribal members now own more than half of the land on the reservation for the first time in recent history". Major acquisitions include White Horse Golf Club in 2010, placed into trust in March 2014; and 200 acres known as the Place of the Bear, in the Cowling Creek watershed, in November 2014.

As of 2014, the reservation area consists of 7,657 acres, of which 1,475 acres are owned by the Suquamish Tribe, 2,601 acres are owned by individual citizens of the Suquamish Tribe, and 3,581 acres are owned by non-Natives.

References

External links 

Suquamish Tribe (Port Madison Indian Reservation) homepage
Suquamish Museum
Tulalip Tribes v. Suquamish Indian Tribe, 794 F.3d 1129 (9th Cir. 2015) — decision of the U.S. Court of Appeals for the Ninth Circuit in a treaty fishing rights case

 
Native American tribes
Coast Salish
Native American tribes in Washington (state)